Olga Alekseyevna Zaitseva (born 16 May 1978) is a former Russian biathlete. She began her career in 1994. After not competing in the 2014–15 season, Zaitseva announced her retirement on 24 January 2015. Shortly afterwards she announced that she had been appointed as caretaker head coach of the Russian biathlon team.

Record

Olympic Games
Zaitseva has won two gold medals and one silver medal at the Winter Olympic Games.

On 1 December 2017, she was disqualified from the 2014 Winter Olympics for doping offences. She appealed this decision to the Court of Arbitration for Sport in 2018. After a postponement that lasted until 2020, the Court of Arbitration for Sport upheld her disqualification; however, it lifted her lifetime ban from all Olympic Games.

World Championships
Zaitseva has won eight medals — three gold, two silver and three bronze. All her World Championship medals Zaitseva won in two Championships: 2005 Hochfilzen, Austria and 2009 Pyeongchang, South Korea.

World Cup

During her first 1999—2000 World Cup season, Zaitseva only appeared in one race, didn't scoring for the overall standings. Starting from the second half 2001—02 season, she became a regular in the Russian World Cup team. The best result is the 4th place in the 2004—05 season and winning the mass start discipline cup of the same season. All her results from the 2013-14 season after Sochi were voided due to doping offences.

*Key:Races—number of entered races/all races; Points—won World Cup points; Position—World Cup season ranking.
**2011–12 season in progress. Statistics as of 15 January 2012.

World Cup wins
Over the course of her career, Zaitseva has reached twelve personal World Cup wins. In the history of the International Biathlon Union she is ranked twelfth for all-time career victories. In addition, she has won twelve relay races and two mixed relay events as part of the Russian World Cup team.

Key:WCH—World Championships; OG—Olympic Games.
2011–12 season in progress. Statistics as of 15 January 2012.

Overall record
As of January 2012, Zaitseva has competed in a total of 208 races at senior level, winning 26 of them (a 12.5 win percentage), including 174 races with 12 wins (a 6.9 win percentage) in individual events. She has claimed at least two wins in each discipline of biathlon. Zaitseva has reached a total of 60 World Cup podiums (28.8%): 37 in individual races (21.3%) and 23 in team events (67.6%). In addition, she has achieved 120 top ten finishes — 57.7% of all the races she has entered (including 88 top ten results (50.6%) in individual races).

*Results in all IBU World Cup races. Statistics as of 15 January 2012.

Achievements and honours

Sport titles
Winter Olympics
2010 – Gold medal in the Relay, silver medal in the 12.5 km Mass Start
2006 – Gold medal in the Relay
World Championships
2009 – Gold medal in the 12.5 km Mass Start and Relay, bronze in the 7.5 km Sprint and 10 km Pursuit
2005 – Gold medal in the Relay, silver in the 7.5 km Sprint and Mixed Relay and bronze in the 10 km Pursuit.
 Mass Start World Cup winner — 2004–05

State Decorations and Awards
 The Order of Friendship (5 March 2010).
 Medal of the Order "For Merits to the Fatherland" 2nd Class (22 February 2007).
 Medal of the Order "For Merits to the Fatherland" 2nd Class (17 January 2003).
 Honoured Master of Sports (2005).

Other Awards
 The Best Russian Athlete of the Year according to the vote at Sportbox.ru — 2011.

Personal life
Zaitseva has two sisters: Elena (b. 1976) and Oksana (b. 1973), who was her coach.

On 30 September 2006, Zaitseva married Milan Augustin, a Slovakian biathlon coach; they had a son Aleksandr in 2007, but divorced in 2013. In October 2015, Zaitseva gave birth to her second son Stepan. Around that time, she stopped coaching and was employed as a consultant for the Russian biathlon team. She was expected to return to coaching in 2016.

Notes

a. The mixed relay, contested for the first time in the World Championships, was held in 2005.
b. The mixed relay was held in Khanty-Mansiysk, Russia.
c. Until 2010—11 season it was required to leave out the result of the worst discipline race for the final result of discipline world cup (if there were four discipline races or more during the season), so the points in respective columnes «Points» is represented after deduction of the result of the worst discipline race.
d. Since 2008—09 season it was applied another points system in World Cup. Earlier biathlete got 50 points for win and top-30 was awarded. Now World Cup give 60 points and top-40 awarded.
e. Until 2010—11 season it was required to leave out the results of the three worst races for the final result of overall world cup, so the points in respective column «Points» is represented after deduction of the results of the three worst discipline races.
f.  Did not finish (DNF).
g.  Disqualified (DSQ).

References

External links

Official website 
 
Profile on RBU website
Statistics at biathlon.com.ua
Profile on CSKA website 
Olga Zaitseva: Lynchpin of the Russian biathlon squad

1978 births
Living people
Skiers from Moscow
Russian female biathletes
Biathletes at the 2002 Winter Olympics
Biathletes at the 2006 Winter Olympics
Biathletes at the 2010 Winter Olympics
Biathletes at the 2014 Winter Olympics
Olympic biathletes of Russia
Medalists at the 2006 Winter Olympics
Medalists at the 2010 Winter Olympics
Competitors stripped of Winter Olympics medals
Olympic medalists in biathlon
Olympic silver medalists for Russia
Olympic gold medalists for Russia
Biathlon World Championships medalists
Universiade medalists in biathlon
Holmenkollen Ski Festival winners
Cross-country skiing coaches
Russian sports coaches
Recipients of the Medal of the Order "For Merit to the Fatherland" I class
Recipients of the Medal of the Order "For Merit to the Fatherland" II class
Doping cases in biathlon
Russian sportspeople in doping cases
Universiade bronze medalists for Russia
Competitors at the 2001 Winter Universiade
Russian State University of Physical Education, Sport, Youth and Tourism alumni